Herborn may refer to:

 Herborn, Hesse, a German town in the state of Hesse
 Herborn, Rhineland-Palatinate, a German village in the state of Rhineland-Palatinate
 Herborn, Luxembourg, a village in Luxembourg
 Herborn, Illinois, an unincorporated community in Shelby County, Illinois
 Herborn, New South Wales, a parish in Raleigh County, New South Wales